Luka Bašič (born October 7, 1989) is a retired Slovenian ice hockey player who last played for HDD Jesenice of the Alps Hockey League.

Bašič competed in the 2013 IIHF World Championship as a member of the Slovenia men's national ice hockey team.

References

External links

1989 births
Living people
HDD Jesenice players
HC Astana players
Bisons de Neuilly-sur-Marne players
Bracknell Bees players
HK Dukla Michalovce players
Gothiques d'Amiens players
HDD Olimpija Ljubljana players
HC Nové Zámky players
Slovenian ice hockey right wingers
Sportspeople from Ljubljana
Competitors at the 2011 Winter Universiade
Slovenian expatriate sportspeople in Sweden
Slovenian expatriate sportspeople in Slovakia
Slovenian expatriate sportspeople in Kazakhstan
Slovenian expatriate sportspeople in France
Slovenian expatriate sportspeople in England
Slovenian expatriate ice hockey people
Expatriate ice hockey players in Sweden
Expatriate ice hockey players in Slovakia
Expatriate ice hockey players in Kazakhstan
Expatriate ice hockey players in France
Expatriate ice hockey players in England
HK Olimpija players